Mary Miss (born May 27, 1944) is an American artist and designer. Her work has crossed boundaries between architecture, landscape architecture, engineering and urban design. Her installations are collaborative in nature: she has worked with scientists, historians, designers, and public administrators. She is primarily interested in how to engage the public in decoding their surrounding environment.

Early life and education 
Miss was born May 27, 1944 in New York City, but she spent her youth moving every year while living primarily in the western United States.

Miss studied art and received a B.A. from the University of California, Santa Barbara in 1966. Miss later received an M.F.A. from the Rhinehart School of Sculpture of Maryland Institute College of Art in 1968.

Influence in public art 

As a public artist, Miss is considered a pioneer in environmental art and site-specific art, as well a leading sculptor during the feminist movement of the 1970s. She was a founding member of the journal Heresies. From her earliest work, she has been interested in bringing the specific attributes of a site into focus along with and audience engagement within public space. Miss’ work crosses boundaries between landscape architecture, architecture, urban design, and graphic communication. Her work creates situations that emphasize a site's history, ecology, or aspects of the environment that have gone unnoticed. She has been particularly interested in redefining the role of the artist in the public domain.

In her influential 1979 essay, Sculpture in the Expanded Field, art critic Rosalind Krauss opens with a description of Mary Miss's, Perimeters/Pavilions/Decoys. Krauss uses Miss's work to support her examination of sculpture's interdisciplinary nature between architecture and landscape. South Cove (1988), a permanent public project in Battery Park, is a seminal project in Miss' career as it signified new possibilities for artists working in the public realm. The project, located on a three-acre site at the base of the riverfront Esplande, was made in collaboration with architect Stanton Eckstut and landscape designer Susan Child. "South Cove brings the public more intimately in contact with the water than any other component of Battery park City or, indeed, any other Manhattan riverside park."

Miss has worked on the development of the project City as Living Laboratory, which, according to the project's description, collaborates with artists, environmental designers and scientists to focus on and explore sustainability in cities.

Selected works 
Battery Park Landfill (1973) installation was a temporary piece of five signboard-like structures, placed 50-feet apart across the landfill site. A series of large cut out circles descended into the ground describing a column of air that materialized only when the viewer stood with the boards aligned.

Untitled (1973) was created in April and May 1973 at the Allen Memorial Art Museum in Oberlin, Ohio, as part of the exhibition Four Young Americans (which also featured Ann McCoy, Ree Morton, and Jackie Winsor). This initial version of the work comprised wooden slats protruding directly along the sides of a square hole cut into the ground on the northeast lawn of the museum. The museum subsequently invited Miss to re-create the work using permanent materials—making this her first permanent commissioned work and her earliest extant public work. Constructed in the summer of 1975 under the artist's supervision, the second version was created with powder-coated steel slats protruding from tinted concrete, in its original siting.

The Des Moines Art Center (1989–96), Des Moines, Iowa, is a 7.5-acre site developed as both an art installation and restoration site. It includes a demonstration wetland, outdoor classroom, overhanging walkways, a pavilion, and a curved trellis. The structures highlight the connection between land and water. Visual elements and images are interwoven throughout the site to reflect the history of the park and its surroundings. Framing Union Square] (installed 1998), New York City, Miss collaborated with architect Lee Harris Pomeroy to create 125 red frame elements scattered throughout the Fourteenth Street Union Square Subway Station. The red elements highlight the disappearance of lost infrastructure as well as industrial elements that remain.

 CALL projects Roshanara's Net (2008) created a temporary garden of medicinal plants—ayurvedic herbs, trees and bushes—in New Delhi, India. The installation focused on the health and well being of the individuals and their communities.StreamLines (2013) installed a cluster of mirrors and red beams in five Indianapolis neighborhoods, which radiate out from a central point to nearby streams and waterways. The installation was intended to get visitors to follow the beams to the nearby waterways. This project was made possible by a grant from the National Science Foundation.

 Exhibitions 
Miss was included in the exhibition Twenty-Six Contemporary Women Artists at the Aldrich Museum in 1971. Lucy Lippard was the curator, and other artists included Alice Aycock and Jackie Winsor. She was also included in the exhibition Four Young Americans alongside the artists Ann McCoy, Ree Morton, and Jackie Winsor, curated by Ellen H. Johnson and Athena Tacha at the Allen Memorial Art Museum at Oberlin College.

Along with others, Miss's work has been included in the exhibitions Decoys, Complexes and Triggers at the Sculpture Center in New York, Weather Report: Art and Climate Change organized by Lucy Lippard at the Boulder Museum of Contemporary Art, More Than Minimal: Feminism and Abstraction in the 1970s at the Rose Art Museum, and Century City: Art and Culture in the Modern Metropolis at the Tate Modern.

Miss has also been the subject of exhibitions at the Harvard University Art Museum, Brown University Gallery, The Institute of Contemporary Art in London, the Architectural Association in London, Harvard University's Graduate School of Design, and the Des Moines Art Center.

 Selected group exhibitions 
 Sculpture Annual (1970) Whitney Museum of American Art, New York
 Whitney Biennial (1973) Whitney Museum of American Art, New YorkRooms (1976) P.S. 1, Institute for Art and Urban Resources, Long Island City, New York
Nine Artists: Theodoran Awards (1977) Solomon R. Guggenheim Museum, NY
Architectural Analogues (1978) Whitney Museum of American Art, New York
 The Minimal Tradition (1979) Aldrich Museum of Contemporary Art, Ridgefield, Connecticut
Drawing:The Pluralist Decade (1980) Venice Biennale, Italy
Whitney Biennial (1981) Whitney Museum of American Art, NYHabitats (1983) P.S. 1, Institute for Art and Urban Resources, Long Island City, New York
Metamanhattan (1984) Whitney Museum of American Art, Downtown Branch, NY
Sitings (1986) La Jolla Museum of Contemporary Art, La Jolla, CA; Dallas
New Photography 8 (1992) MoMA, New York
The Second Dimension: 20th Century Sculptors Drawings (1993) Brooklyn Museum, New York
 More Than Minimal: Feminism and Abstraction in the 70's (1996) Rose Art Museum, Brandeis University, Waltham MA.
 100 Drawings (1999) P.S. 1, Contemporary Art Museum, Long Island City, New York
 Primarily Structural: Minimalist and Post-Minimalist Works on Paper (1999) P.S. 1, Contemporary Art Museum, Long Island City, New York
Biennial Exhibition of Public Art, Neuberger Museum of Art (1999) S.U.N.Y. Purchase, NY.
Earthworks: Land Reclamation as Sculpture (2000) Seattle Art Museum, Seattle, WA.
Century City: Art and Culture in the Modern Metropolis (2001) Tate Modern, London, England
The Art of 9/11 (2005) Apex Art, New York
Weather Report: Artists & Climate Change (2007) curated by Lucy Lippard, Boulder Museum of Contemporary Art, Boulder, CO
 Decoys, Complexes, and Triggers: Feminism and Land Art in the 1970s (2008) Sculpture Center, Long Island City, NYModern Women: Single Channel (2011) MoMA P.S. 1, Queens, New York
 Ends of the Earth: Land Art to 1974 (2012) The Museum of Contemporary Art, Los Angeles, CA
 Social Ecologies (2015) curated by Greg Lindquist, The Brooklyn Rail Curatorial Projects, Brooklyn, NY
 Minimalism: Space. Light. Object (2018), National Gallery, Singapore.
 Female Minimal (2020) Galerie Thaddaeus Ropac, Pantin, France

 Selected solo exhibitions Projects (1976) Museum of Modern Art, New YorkPerimeters/Pavilions/Decoys (1978) Nassau County Museum of Fine Arts, Roslyn, NYScreened Court (1979) Minneapolis College of Art, MNMirror Way (1980) Fogg Art Museum Harvard University, Cambridge, MAMary Miss, (1981) Brown University and University of Rhode Island, Kingston, RIArt and Architecture (1983) Institute of Contemporary Art, London, EnglandPool Complex: Orchard Valley (1983–1985) Laumeier Sculpture Park, St. Louis, MissouriInterior Works: 1966-1984, (1984) Protetch-McNeil Gallery, NY
 Mary Miss : Projects, 1966-1987 (1987), Architectural Association, LondonMary Miss, Photo/Drawings (1991), Freedman Gallery, Albright College, Reading, PAMary Miss Photo/Drawings (1996), Des Moines Art Center, Des Moines, IAMary Miss: An Artist Working in the Public Domain (2000), Roger Williams University, Bristol, RI
 Mary Miss: City as Living Laboratory, Hartford (2010-2011) Joseloff Gallery, Hartford, Connecticut

 Awards and honors 
Miss received the New York City American Society of Landscape Architects President's Award in 2010, the American Academy in Rome's Centennial Medal in 2001, and a Medal of Honor from the American Institute of Architects in 1990. She received a fellowship from the John Simon Guggenheim Memorial Foundation in 1986. She was awarded grants by the National Endowment for the Arts in 1984, 1975, and 1974.

 Creative Artists Public Service (CAPS) grants (1973, 1977)
Project Grant, Mott Community College, Flint, MI, 1974
 New York State Council on the Arts (1973, 1976)
 Brandeis University Creative Arts award (1982)
 Philip N. Winslow Landscape Design Award, Parks Council, NYC (1992)
 Urban Design award (in collaboration with Studio Works), Progressive Architecture Magazine (1992)
The 2000 New York City Masterworks Award, The Municipal Arts Society and GVA Williams (2000)
Tau Sigma Delta Gold Medal, Tau Sigma Delta Honor Society for Architecture and Allied Arts (2004)
China Sculpture Institute, Honorable Member (2008)
NOAA Environmental Literacy Grant for FLOW: An Innovative Educational Toolkit for Rivers Awareness (2010)
Graham Foundation for Advanced Studies in the Fine Arts Grant, for BROADWAY: 1000 Steps (2010)
Anonymous Was A Woman, Visual Art New York, NY (2011)
National Science Foundation Award For Informal Science Education (ISE) for BROADWAY: 1000 STEPS (2011)
New York City Award for Excellence in Design for The Passage: A Moving Memorial (2012)
Pollock-Krasner Foundation Grant (2013)
National Science Foundation Award for Indianapolis: City As Living Laboratory (2013)
Award of Merit, The American Institute for Architecture (2015)
Bedrock of New York Award (2017)
Global Excellence Award, Urban Land Institute (2018)

She was named as a distinguished alumni of UC Santa Barbara in 1985.

 Personal life 
Miss married sculptor Bruce Colvin in 1967, but later divorced in 1986. She is currently married to George Peck, a New York-based artist. They live together in Tribeca where Miss also has her studio.

 Further reading 
 Kingsley, April. "Six Women at Work in a Landscape." Arts Magazine 52 (April 1978): 108–12.
 Lippard, Lucy. "Mary Miss: An Extremely Clear Situation." Art in America 62 (March–April 1974): 76–7.
 Marter, Joan M. "Collaborations: Artists and Architects on Public Sites." Art Journal 48 (1989): 315–20.
 Miss, Mary. "On a Redefinition of Public Sculpture." Perspecta'', no. 21 (1984): 52–69.
Hamill, Sarah. "‘The Skin of the Earth’: Mary Miss's Untitled 1973/75 and the Politics of Precarity." Oxford Art Journal 41: 2 (August 2018): 271–291.

References

External links 
 
 MoMA Multimedia - Modern Women: Mary Miss
 Art Spaces Archive Project: Interview with Mary Miss
 City Atlas New York: Interview with Mary Miss
 The Heretics: Mary Miss
 The Cultural Landscape Foundation: Pioneer Mary Miss

1944 births
Living people
Environmental artists
University of California, Santa Barbara alumni
20th-century American women artists
Heresies Collective members
Maryland Institute College of Art alumni
Artists from New York City